Cherokee Council may be:

 Cherokee Area Council (Tennessee)
 Cherokee Council (Georgia)
 Cherokee Council (North Carolina)